David Shaw (born 29 October 1938, in Ballarat) is a former Australian rules footballer who played for Essendon in the VFL during the 1960s.

University Blues recruit David Shaw was a versatile player and made his senior debut in 1959. He played in four Grand Finals with Essendon over the course of his career, winning in 1962 and 1965.

Shaw remained actively involved with the Essendon Football Club after his playing days were over, serving on their committee and was club president from 1993 to 1996.

External links

1938 births
Australian rules footballers from Victoria (Australia)
Essendon Football Club players
Essendon Football Club Premiership players
University Blues Football Club players
Essendon Football Club administrators
Living people
Two-time VFL/AFL Premiership players